Pascale Ferran (born 17 April 1960) is a French film director and screenwriter. In 2007, her film Lady Chatterley won five César Awards including Best Film, Best Cinematography and Best Adaptation. Her 2014 film Bird People was selected to compete in the Un Certain Regard section at the 2014 Cannes Film Festival. Ferran also wrote the screenplay for The Red Turtle, an animated film by Michael Dudok de Wit, that competed in the Hawaii International Film Festival on 12 November 2016.

Early life 
Pascale Ferran was born on April 17, 1960 in Paris, France. From a young age she was involved in cinema, operating the film club at her high school. From 1980 to 1983 she attended IDHEC, which is now known as prestigious La Fémis.

Career

Directing and Screenwriting 
Ferran helped to write the documentary Mange ta soupe by Mathieu Amalric, which was released in 1997. Shortly after, in 1998, Ferran wrote, filmed, and directed Quatre jours à Ocoee', a documentary about a jazz music record. Released in 2000, this documentary was filmed in Florida. Around this time Ferran also wrote Paratonerre which, due to funding, has never been released. In 1999 Ferran directed a film dubbing of Stanley Kubrick's 1999 film Eyes Wide Shut.

Film Festivals 
As a director and screenwriter, Ferran has also participated in a number of film festivals. She showed a new film at the 4th annual French Film Festival UK in 1996 and, in 1997 at the 5th annual festival, presented Coming to Terms with the Dead with Pierre Trividic. In June 2014 Ferran also participated in the 12th Brussels Film Festival.

Cannes Film Festival 
From 1990 to the present, Ferran has had a steady presence at the Cannes Film Festival. Her involvement in works that were screened at Cannes include:
 1990 directed The Kiss
 1992 credited as co-screenwriter for Arnaud Desplechin's The Sentinel
 1994 directed Coming to Terms with the Dead in the Cinémas en France category of the Cannes Film Festival and won the Caméra d'Or Award.
 2007 selected as the president and chair of the Un Certain Regard jury at the 60th annual Cannes Film Festival.
 2014 directed and wrote the screenplay for Bird People, which was selected to compete in the Un Certain Regard section of the festival.

Awards 
Ferran's critically acclaimed adaptation of Lady Chatterley's Lover won the Prix Louis-Delluc award and five César awards for Best Film, Adaptation, Photography, Actress, and Costumes.

Influences 
Ferran is a sought after lecturer. As early as 2007, as part of the Angers Workshops, she has taught master classes on directing, screenwriting, and filmmaking in general. On September 7, 2014 she taught a master class at Alliance Française in Toronto, Ontario titled "Gravity and Grace". A segment of this film festival was actually dedicated as a "Tribute to Pascale Ferran". Also in 2014, as part of the Carte Noire IFI French Film Festival and under the category "French Fest", Ferran taught a master class titled "Literary Adaptation and Visual Effects". This collaborative effort by the French Embassy in Dublin and the Irish Film Institute also featured notable guests such as Mathieu Amalric, Assa Sylla, and Antoine de Baecque.

On March 19, 2016, at the 38th International Festival of Women's Films Films, Ferran and composer Béatrice Thiriet presented a master class together. The two women have collaborated previously on multiple projects, most recently Bird People in 2014 and Lady Chatterley in 2006.

Ferran is also, as of 2016, on the board of directors of SRF, or La Société des Réalisateurs de Films.[1]

Personal life 
In 2002 Ferran appeared, as herself, in Romain Goupil's documentary Une Pure Coïncidence.

To date, Ferran is politically conscious and frequently defending and advocating for worker's rights in the film industry, as well as the rights of illegal immigrants. She was in Calais, France in August 2016 when a group of migrants attacked vehicles and wrote to testify on behalf of the migrants.

Ferran helped to found and launch LaCinetek in 2015.

Filmography

References

External links

1960 births
Living people
French women film directors
Film directors from Paris
French women screenwriters
French screenwriters
Best Director Lumières Award winners
Directors of Caméra d'Or winners